Jinn is a Jordanian Arabic-language supernatural drama streaming television series, created and executive produced by Mir-Jean Bou Chaaya, Elan Dassani and Rajeev Dassani alongside Christian Bou Chaaya and Lucien Bou Chaaya. The series premiered on Netflix on June 13, 2019. The series stars Salma Malhas, Hamzeh Okab, Sultan Alkhail, Aysha Shahaltough, Zaid Zoubi, Yasser Al Hadi, Mohammad Nizar, Mohammad Hindieh and Karam Tabbaa.

Premise
Jinn follows the story of a group of teenagers, who study in a private school in Amman. They go on a field trip to Petra, which is known as home to ancient demons and strange phenomena. The group's lives are disrupted when a spiritual figure appears, accidentally summoned by Mira. They must try and stop Jinn from destroying the world.

Cast and characters
 Salma Malhas as Miraa
 Sultan Alkhail as Yassin
 Hamzeh Okab as Kerasquioxian (Keras) / Hosni
 Aysha Shahaltough as Vera
 Zaid Zoubi as Hassan
 Ban Halaweh as Layla
 Yasser Al Hadi as Fahed
 Mohammad Nizar as Nasser
 Mohammad Hindieh as Omar
 Karam Tabbaa as Jameel
 Abdelrazzaq Jarkas as Tareq
 Hana Chamoun as Miss Ola
 Faris Al Bahri as Naji
 Manal Sehaimat as Lubna

Episodes

Production

Development
On February 26, 2018, it was announced that Netflix had given a series order to Jinn, a new television series, directed by Mir-Jean Bou Chaaya, and executive produced by Elan and Rajeev Dassani. The series order was reportedly for a first season of five episodes.

On August 13, 2018, it was announced that in addition to serving as director, Mir-Jean Bou Chaaya would also act as an executive producer. Additionally, it was further reported that writers would include Elan and Rajeev Dassani and Amin Matalqa. Elan was expected to serve as head writer while Matalqa was slated to direct two episodes. Production companies involved with the series set to consist of Kabreet Productions and Master Key Productions. On April 18, 2019, it was announced that the series is scheduled to premiere on June 13, 2019.

Casting
Alongside the start of production announcement, it was confirmed that the series would star Salma Malhas, Hamzeh Okab, Sultan Alkhail, Aysha Shahaltough, Yasser Al Hadi, and Ban Halaweh.

Filming
Principal photography began on August 13, 2018 in Amman, Jordan. The shoot was scheduled to last over the course of ten weeks with filming locations including Petra, Wadi Rum as well as a dozen locations in Amman.

Critical reception 
The show was panned by Middle East Eye as "badly scripted, poorly acted and sloppily directed", while Thrillist called it "generic," "unrealistic," and "confusing."

Jinn has an 83% rating on Rotten Tomatoes, out of six reviews. Positive reviews praised its consistency, intrigue, and novelty factor. Negative reviews criticize the quality of its acting and script.

The series generated controversy for the scenes that feature “moral degradation”. These include two instances where Malhas's character kissed two different men in separate scenes. Another complaint involved the series's rough language. Jinn became controversial in Jordan, with some government agencies threatening censorship. It was reported that Jordan's top prosecutor asked the Ministry of Interior to stop the show's broadcast.

References

External links

 

2019 Jordanian television series debuts
Dark fantasy television series
Thriller television series
Arabic-language Netflix original programming
Jordanian television series
Genies in television
Television controversies in Jordan
2010s supernatural television series
2010s teen drama television series
Obscenity controversies in television
Television shows filmed in Jordan
Television series about teenagers